Bahan (also Romanized as Bahān and Behān; also known as Dīhūn) is a village in Doboluk Rural District, Arjomand District, Firuzkuh County, Tehran Province, Iran. At the 2006 census, its population was 218, in 57 families.

References 

Populated places in Firuzkuh County